Gonâve Island or Zile Lagonav (also La Gonâve) is an island of Haiti located west-northwest of Port-au-Prince in the Gulf of Gonâve. It is the largest of the Hispaniolan satellite islands. The island is an arrondissement (Arrondissement de La Gonâve) or Ouest-Insulaire in the Ouest and includes the communes of Anse-à-Galets and Pointe-à-Raquette.

Etymology
La Gonave or Gonave is a gallicised form of Guanabo.

History

Taino Period
The indigenous Taínos called the island Guanabo. Under the leadership of Hatuey, the island was the last refuge of the natives after the invasion of the Europeans.

European Period
No major French or Spanish settlement was built in La Gonave. During the colonial period, the island was uninhabited by colonists, which led the indigenous Taínos to seek refuge there after early battles with the Spanish. Runaway slaves in the French period, too, sometimes sought out the island for a place to hide from their owners on the mainland.

Haitian Period
The island has been officially under Haitian control since Toussaint Louverture and the Constitution of 1801.

Modern Period
On July 18th, 1926, U.S. Marine Corps Sergeant Faustin E. Wirkus (1896–1945) was proclaimed by the residents of the island as King Faustin II, where he ruled over the island with the tribal queen Ti Mememnne as co-monarchs. His reign lasted until 1929, when he peacefully abdicated and returned home to the United States. Ti Memenne would continue to unofficially rule the island until her death in that same year. For context, Haiti is a republic and abolished the monarchy in 1859 with Fabre Nicolas Geffrard.

In the mid-1980s, British singer Cliff Richard wrote and recorded a song "La Gonave" for relief aid for the people of the island. It is included on his album The Rock Connection.

The island's docks were damaged by the 2010 Haiti earthquake of 12 January 2010. In the wake of the damage, supplies have been airlifted in to the  dirt strip.

Overgrazing and over-exploitation of water resources affect the island's current residents.

Independence movement
The island inhabitants have pushed the idea of independence from Haiti in other to achieve economical prosperity. Although this is unconstitutional, La Gonave has a case for being an eventual special territory or department.

Geography
The island sits in the middle of the Gulf of Gonave, south of St-Marc, north of Miragoanes, and west of Port-au-Prince. It forms the canal of St-Marc with the Cote des Arcadins and the Canal of the South and Miragoanes.

The island is mostly barren and hilly with the highest point reaching .

The barren, dry nature of the soil has long prevented agricultural development on the island and kept the population lower than it otherwise might have been.

Administrative division

La Gonâve arrondissement is divided into two communes: Anse-à-Galets and Pointe-à-Raquette. These are further subdivided into eleven sections and two towns (villes). The towns are Anse-à-Galets and Pointe-à-Raquette, named after their respective communes. Anse-à-Galets is the largest settlement on the island with an estimated 2015 population of 52,662 of the island's total population of 87,077.

Water scarcity
In 2005, following a particularly drastic drought, the Mayor of Anse-à-Galets formed the Water Platform, composed of service groups working on the island.  Current participants include the Mayors of Anse-à-Galets and Pointes a Racquette, the Deputy, Justice of the Peace, World Vision, Concern WorldWide, Sevis Kretyen, the Matènwa Community Learning Center, the Alleghany Weslyen Church, the Methodist Church, Haiti Outreach and many others.  The Water Platform acts as a focal point for activities on the island, providing a coordination point for the multitude of groups working on La Gonâve.

Assistance efforts
The members of the Water Platform have been working to address the water needs of the island by capping springs, building rainwater catchment cisterns, building water systems and drilling wells. Dozens of rainwater catchment cisterns and wells have been drilled on the island as an effort to bring water relief to the residents of the island.

2002–2004 Guts Church funded construction of a school providing first through sixth grade education and construction of a medical clinic providing free medical, dental and vision services for Haitians

, there were two non-profit groups actively drilling water wells on the island: Haiti Outreach, which has financed and drilled water wells in 25 communities; and Guts Church in Tulsa, Oklahoma. The Tougher Than Hell Motorcycle Rally, organized by Guts Church, has sponsored 10 water wells drilled on the island.

In 2010 Coordinated relief efforts after the 12 January earthquake. $250,000 was raised for this relief project. Medical supplies, building supplies, 150 tons of rice and beans and a backhoe were purchased. Aid was shipped to La Gonâve via a leased vessel and delivered directly to La Gonâve in early March 2010. The aid shipment fed 50,000 people for one month.

 there are over 70 water wells fully functional on the island

The drilling of more wells on the island has been planned for the near future.

Since 2007, the Washington D.C.-based nonprofit Roots of Development and its La Gonâve-based Haitian sister organization Rasin Devlopman have been providing leadership and capacity-building programs to community leaders and locally elected officials on the island. The two organizations provide leaders access to professional facilitators, workshops and trainings, and material and financial resources, to help them strengthen local capacity and improve quality of life on the island. 
 
Founded in 2014, the Australian-based non-profit organisation For You Haiti began coordinating surgeries for children from la Gonâve island. The children receive medical treatment on the mainland of Haiti and in the United States. For You Haiti has a mentoring program for men and women to start small businesses in Haiti, with the goal of empowering communities to break the cycle of poverty. In 2016, For You Haiti started the Hungry Tummies Project at Complexe Scolaire Amis des Enfants and began growing their own food in the region of Palma, in the hope of making lasting change for the la Gonâvian people.

"Fierté gonavienne" disaster
On 8 September 1997, a ferry from La Gonâve to the Montrouis on the Haitian mainland sank with hundreds of passengers aboard. It is considered the worst disaster in Haitian maritime history since the "Neptune" accident in 1993.

Sports Team
Roulado - professional football club

Notable natives and residents
Faustin E. Wirkus - King of La Gonâve (Faustin II)
Ti Memenne of La Gonâve - Queen of La Gonâve

See also

List of lighthouses in Haiti

References

Gulf of Gonâve
Islands of Haiti
La Gonâve
La Gonâve
Lighthouses in Haiti